A Drilling jumbo or drill jumbo is a rock drilling machine.

Use 
Drilling jumbos are usually used in underground mining, if mining is done by drilling and blasting. They are also used in tunnelling, if rock hardness prevents use of tunnelling machines. It is considered as a powerful tool to facilitate labor-intensive process for mineral extraction.

Description 
A drilling jumbo consists of one, two or three rock drill carriages, sometimes a platform, which the miner stands on to load the holes with explosives, clear the face of the tunnel or do something else. The carriages are bolted onto the chassis, which supports also the miners cabin and of course the engine. Modern drilling jumbos are relatively large, there are however smaller ones for use in cramped conditions. Whereas modern jumbos usually fitted with rubber tyres and diesel-powered, there are also exist variants with steel wheels, to ride on rails and even single carriage sled-mounted ones. Electric power is also common, historic jumbos were powered by compressed air. Electricity and compressed air produce no exhaust gases, which is preferable if work is done in smaller tunnels where good ventilation is difficult.

Mining equipment